Vladimir Chernyshev may refer to:

 Vladimir Chernyshyov (1951–2004), Russian volleyball player
 Vladimir Chernyshev (boxer) (born 1948), Russian boxer